Billy Eugene Self Jr. (born December 27, 1962) is an American basketball coach. He is the head men's basketball coach at the University of Kansas, a position he has held since 2003. During his 20 seasons as head coach, he has led the Jayhawks to 17 Big 12 regular season championships, including an NCAA record 14 consecutive Big 12 regular season championships, some of which were shared (2005–2018). He has also led the Jayhawks to four NCAA Final Four appearances (2008, 2012, 2018, 2022), the 2008 NCAA championship and 2022 NCAA championship. Self was inducted into the Naismith Memorial Basketball Hall of Fame in 2017. At the end of the 2021–22 season, Self had the 18th most wins among Division I coaches in NCAA history and 4th among active head coaches. He is the second-winningest coach in Kansas history, behind only Hall of Famer Phog Allen and is the only coach in Kansas history to lead Kansas to multiple NCAA Tournament National Championships.

As coach at Kansas, Self has a record of 292–16 (.948 win percentage) at Allen Fieldhouse. In his tenure at Kansas, Self has had 3 home winning streaks of more than 30 wins including a school-record and 11th-best all-time 69 game streak. During his tenure at Kansas, he has recruited several McDonald's All-Americans to Kansas, including Mario Chalmers, Darrell Arthur, Xavier Henry, Andrew Wiggins, Cliff Alexander, Wayne Selden Jr., Cheick Diallo, and Josh Jackson. Under Self, Kansas rarely loses consecutive games, only fourteen times since taking over. As of February 18, 2023, Self is 110–17 following a loss at Kansas and has only had four three-game losing streaks. He has never lost more than three games in a row. Self’s teams at Kansas are also consistently ranked. As of February 18, 2023, Kansas has only played 41 of his 703 games as head coach unranked.

Self has implemented a strong high-low motion offense using size as an advantage in the paint, and a pressing man-to-man defense on all of his teams from his early coaching days at the University of Tulsa through the present. He has also shown great adaptability on the court and has implemented sometimes drastic adjustments as needed to his defensive schemes with various degrees of success. Despite Self's consistency, many reporters questioned his abilities in the NCAA tournament because of his 4–7 record in the Elite 8, but since starting his career 0–4 in the regional final round, he is 4–3 in his last seven Elite 8 appearances. Self has taken Kansas to nine Elite 8 appearances in his 19 seasons at KU, which is the most visits to that round of the tournament in that time frame.

Self was the highest paid NCAA basketball coach for the 2021–22 season. He made $10,184,282 that season. He signed a lifetime contract extension with the Jayhawks in 2021. In 2022, Self became the seventh coach to win multiple NCAA tournament championships since the tournament field expanded to 64 teams in 1985.

Early life
Self was born in Okmulgee, Oklahoma, where his father was the girls' basketball coach at nearby Morris High School. Self attended Edmond Memorial High School, where he was named Oklahoma High School Basketball Player of the Year in 1981.

Playing career
Self received a basketball scholarship to play at Oklahoma State University. He was a letter winner all four years he played. He graduated with a bachelor's degree in business in 1985 and a master's degree in athletic administration in 1989, both from Oklahoma State.

Statistics

Collegiate coaching history

Early coaching jobs
In 1985, Self joined Larry Brown's coaching staff at the University of Kansas. He remained at Kansas as an assistant coach for the 1985–1986 season. Between 1986 and 1993, Self was an assistant coach at Oklahoma State University under Leonard Hamilton, followed by Eddie Sutton.

Oral Roberts
Self's first head coaching position came at Oral Roberts who hired him in 1993. In his first season at ORU, the team managed only six wins/victories. Things improved slightly the following year, when ORU won ten games. In Self's third season, he guided the Golden Eagles to an 18–9 record, and in his fourth season, (1996–1997), ORU registered a 21–7 record as the school made its first postseason tournament appearance since its 1983–1984 appearance in the National Invitation Tournament.

Tulsa
After rebuilding the Golden Eagles, Self was hired by crosstown rival Tulsa and spent three seasons (1998 to 2000) there, compiling a Tulsa-best 74–27 record. While at TU, Self coached the Golden Hurricane to consecutive NCAA tournament appearances in 1999 and 2000. In the 1999–2000 season, in addition to setting a school single-season record for victories by compiling a 32–5 record, Self led the Golden Hurricane to its first-ever Elite Eight appearance.

Illinois

On June 9, 2000, Illinois named Self the head coach of their basketball program. Self's predecessor, Lon Kruger, had recently left the Illinois program to accept a job in the NBA as head coach of the Atlanta Hawks.

In 2000–01, his first season at Illinois, Self coached a squad of mostly Kruger recruits to a 27–8 record (13–3 conference record), a share of the Big Ten title, and a final Associated Press ranking of 4th in the nation, resulting in the Fighting Illini earning a number 1 seed in the NCAA tournament. Self coached Illinois guards Frank Williams and Cory Bradford, along with guard/forward Sergio McClain, forward Brian Cook, and center Marcus Griffin, to the Elite Eight in the NCAA Tournament. The Illini failed to advance beyond the Elite Eight after falling to eventual tournament finalists number 2 seeded Arizona. The 2000–01 Illini roster included future NBA players Frank Williams, Robert Archibald and Brian Cook. With mostly the same core, Illinois followed up the season with impressive 2001–02 and 2002–03 campaigns, but fell in the NCAA Tournament Sweet Sixteen in 2002 to Kansas, and the second round in 2003 to Notre Dame.

Self was responsible for the recruitment of many of the 2005 Fighting Illini team, which won the Big Ten title under Bruce Weber. Weber replaced Self prior to the 2003–04 season and coached 2005 Fighting Illini to an NCAA record-tying 37–2 record before falling to North Carolina in the NCAA championship game. In Self's three seasons in Illinois, he led the Fighting Illini to two Big Ten regular-season championships, a Big Ten tournament title, and three straight NCAA tournament appearances.

Kansas

2003–07
Kansas hired Self in 2003. He took over for Roy Williams who left for his former team, North Carolina, after KU lost the 2003 National Championship game to Syracuse.

In his first season at Kansas, Self led the Jayhawks to the Elite Eight in the NCAA tournament, where they fell to Georgia Tech.

The following season, the Jayhawks were ranked preseason #1 and started 20–1, but slumped and lost six of their final nine games. Kansas received a #3 seed in the NCAA tournament and lost to #14 seed Bucknell in the first round. The team finished 23–7 and settled for a Big 12 co-championship with Oklahoma.

In 2005–06, little was expected of the young Jayhawks, as they were unranked in the preseason polls and picked to finish 6th in the conference. They began the season 10–6, including 1–2 in the Big 12. Although they did post a 73–46 win over Kentucky, they also saw the end of their 31-game winning streak over rival Kansas State with a 59–55 loss at Allen Fieldhouse, and two nights later blew a seven-point lead in the final 45 seconds of regulation en route to an 89–86 overtime loss at Missouri. But afterward, the Jayhawks matured rapidly, winning 15 of their final 17 games. They picked up impressive road wins over Texas A&M (83–73), Iowa State (95–85), Nebraska (69–48), and Oklahoma State (64–49). They mounted a monumental comeback victory over Oklahoma (59–58) after falling behind by as many as 16 in the second half, and avenged their loss to Missouri with a 79–46 victory over the Missouri Tigers in Lawrence, Kansas.

KU did stumble against Texas, taking an 80–55 beating, but by winning their final two Big 12 games over Colorado and at Kansas State (avenging the earlier loss at home), took advantage of a Texas loss to Texas A&M to force a tie for the Big 12 title at 13–3. KU played as the #2 seed in the Big 12 tournament in Dallas, and avenged the loss to Texas with an 80–68 victory over the Longhorns in the final to clinch the tournament championship. KU was handed a #4 seed for the NCAA tournament but stumbled again in the first round with a loss to the #13 seed Bradley.

Prior to the 2006–07 season, Self was 72–24 (.750) in three seasons at KU, 279–129 (.683) in 13 seasons overall and 13–8 in NCAA tournament play. On February 10, 2007, Self recorded his 300th career win in a 92–74 victory at Missouri. Self led Kansas to the 2007 Big 12 regular-season championship with a 14–2 record, highlighted by a win over Kevin Durant-led Texas in a pair of monumental, come-from-behind victories in the last game of the regular season and in the Big 12 Championship game. At the end of the regular season, Kansas stood at 27–4 and ranked #2 in the nation in both the AP and Coaches' polls. In the NCAA tournament, Self's Jayhawks received a #1 seed, and advanced to Self's fourth career Elite Eight, with the team garnering commanding wins over #16 seeded Niagara and #8 seeded Kentucky, as well as a victory over the #4 seeded Southern Illinois. Kansas's tournament run ended in the Elite Eight with a loss to 2-seed UCLA.

2007–08 National Championship season

In 2007–08, Kansas started the season 20–0 before suffering its first loss at Kansas State. Michael Beasley led KSU past the Jayhawks at Bramlage Coliseum. The defeat marked Kansas' first loss in its last 24 trips to Manhattan, Kansas, where KU had remained undefeated since 1983. Kansas eventually won the Big 12 regular-season title and the Big 12 conference tournament, and secured a #1 seed in the NCAA tournament.

On March 30, 2008, Self led Kansas to a win in the Elite Eight over Stephen Curry and the Davidson Wildcats. KU won by two, 59–57, after a last-second shot by Davidson's Jason Richards drew only backboard. The Jayhawks went on to play the overall #1-seeded North Carolina Tar Heels in the semifinals, who were coached by Self's predecessor at Kansas, Roy Williams. The Jayhawks jumped on the Tar Heels early, leading 40–12 at one point, before recording an authoritative 84–66 victory and advancing to the National Championship game.

On April 7, 2008, Kansas defeated John Calipari-led Memphis in overtime, 75–68, earning KU its first National Title since 1988. Mario Chalmers, who forced Memphis to overtime by hitting a three-point shot with 2.1 seconds left in regulation, was named Most Outstanding Player in the NCAA Tournament.

In August 2008, Self signed a new 10-year contract guaranteeing him $3 million annually, making him the second-highest-paid coach in college basketball at the time, following Florida's Billy Donovan.

2008–2012
The Jayhawks lost their entire starting lineup and two reserves to the NBA draft following the 2008 season, returning only two role players from the NCAA Championship squad. However, Self did have the 9th best recruiting class in the nation, with two future NBA players Markieff Morris and Marcus Morris. With guard Sherron Collins and center Cole Aldrich, Self responded by coaching the team to a 27–8 season record, a Big 12 championship, a Sweet Sixteen showing in the NCAA tournament, and several national coach of the year awards.

Going into the 2009–10 season, the Jayhawks were ranked number 1 in the preseason polls. The team went 33–3 and won Self's sixth-straight Big 12 Championship, something no team had accomplished in a BCS conference since John Wooden's UCLA teams of the 1960s and 70s. The team also won the Big 12 tournament, Self's third. Self reached his 400th career victory with a win over Iowa State on February 13. The Jayhawks had their 2,000th win in school history under Self when they defeated Texas Tech, joining Kentucky and North Carolina as the only schools to record such an achievement. However, the Jayhawks were seeded 1st in the NCAA tournament and were upset by 9th-seeded Northern Iowa in the second round.

Recruiting began immediately for the 2010–11 season, as Kansas landed top recruit Josh Selby in April. By September 2010, both The Sporting News and Athlon Sports had ranked Kansas in their pre-season outlook as #4 overall and, along with ESPN's Joe Lunardi, were projected to become a #1 seed again in the 2011 NCAA tournament. Blue Ribbon and the USA Today/ESPN coaches polls both placed Kansas at #7 in the pre-season poll. Josh Selby became eligible mid season and joined the Jayhawks beginning December 18 against USC. The Jayhawks went 29–2 during the regular season, winning the Big-12 Conference title and the Big 12 Conference tournament in Kansas City, Missouri.

Self was named Big 12 Coach of the Year for the third time on March 6, both in the coaches' poll and by the Associated Press.  The Jayhawks entered the NCAA Tournament as the #1 seed in the Southwest Region, defeating #16 seed Boston and #9 seed Illinois to advance to the Sweet 16 where they beat #12 seed Richmond. Kansas lost to #11 seed VCU, a team many didn't think deserved to be in the tournament, by 10 points in the Elite Eight after never leading during the game.

Between 2007 and 2011, Self's KU teams won 165 games, an average of 33.0 wins a year, passing Mike Krzyzewski of Duke (164 wins, 32.8 a year from 1998 to 2002) and Jerry Tarkanian of UNLV (163 wins, 32.6 a year from 1987–1991) for the highest 5-year win total of any men's basketball coach in Division I history.

In the 2010–11 season, Self led the Jayhawks past North Carolina to end the season at number 2 on the all-time wins list, trailing leader Kentucky by 14 games (List of teams with the most victories in NCAA Division I men's college basketball).

In 2011–12, having lost four starters from the 2010–11 team, Kansas faced an apparent rebuilding year. Two of Self's recruits were ruled ineligible by the NCAA, and those who moved into the starting positions had seen little action in prior years. Kansas began the season with a 7–3 record, and though there were wins over Georgetown and UCLA in Maui and an upset of Ohio State in Allen Fieldhouse, Kansas lost to Kentucky by ten points, to Duke by seven points in the Maui finals, and to Davidson by six points in an upset in Kansas City. Self later stated that, after the loss to Davidson, he worried of his team's chances of making the NCAA Tournament that year.

Kansas won its last three non-conference games, and went 16–2 through the Big 12 to capture an eighth straight Big 12 regular-season championship. On February 25, 2012, Kansas erased a 19-point deficit at home against its arch-rival, No. 3 ranked Missouri, winning 87–86 in overtime to clinch the Big 12 title. Kansas faltered in the 2012 Big 12 tournament, losing to Baylor in the semifinals.

The Jayhawks entered the 2012 NCAA tournament as a #2-seed in the Midwest Regional. After a win over Detroit Mercy, the Jayhawks rallied for a comeback victory over Purdue in the second round, a game in which Kansas led for only 45 seconds. In the regional rounds, Kansas secured a narrow victory over North Carolina State before facing top-seeded but injury-riddled North Carolina in the regional final. In only their second meeting against former KU coach Roy Williams, the Jayhawks sprinted with UNC to a 47–47 halftime tie, before ultimately claiming an 80–67 victory and a trip to New Orleans for the Final Four.

With a 64–62 victory over Ohio State, Kansas advanced to the championship game to face Kentucky, a rematch of their earlier encounter in November. The Jayhawks fell behind by as many as eighteen points against the Wildcats in the first half. Kansas trimmed the deficit to five late in the second half, but ultimately lost, 67–59. The Jayhawks concluded the year with a 32–7 record, and Self was named the Naismith Coach of the Year.

2012–15

With four seniors in the starting lineup and redshirt freshman Ben McLemore eligible to play, expectations were high for Kansas. The Jayhawks got off to a fast start, winning 19 of their first 20 games, including the CBE Classic in Kansas City. But then they hit a 3-game skid, losing at home to Oklahoma State, at TCU and at Oklahoma. Following the Jayhawks' loss to a TCU team that had been winless in Big 12 play to that point and would finish last in the league, Self made national headlines when he called his team worse than James Naismith's teams that lost to the Topeka YMCA. KU recovered from its 3-game skid and went on to share the Big 12 championship with Kansas State, and then won the Big 12 Tournament by beating KSU 70–54 in the title game. The team earned a 1-seed for the NCAA Tournament's South Region and picked up wins against Western Kentucky and North Carolina to reach the Sweet 16 for the fourth straight year. However, the team's tournament run was cut short when Kansas blew a 14-point lead in the final minutes and lost to eventual national runner-up Michigan in overtime, finishing the year 31–6.

With star freshmen Andrew Wiggins and Joel Embiid on the roster, Kansas entered the season as the #5 team in the country. They started off well with five straight wins, including a victory over Duke in the Champions' Classic. However, the team went 4–4 over its next eight games, including back-to-back losses to Colorado and Florida and an ugly home loss to San Diego State. The team recovered from this rough stretch and began Big 12 play with seven straight wins, ultimately finishing 14–4 to win its 10th consecutive Big 12 title. A back injury to Joel Embiid, however, left the Jayhawks vulnerable on their interior defense, and they fizzled out at season's end with four losses in their final seven games, including a loss to Iowa State in the Big 12 Tournament semifinals in Kansas City and an NCAA Tournament Round of 32 loss to Stanford to end the year. Kansas concluded the year 25–10, the first ten-loss season for Kansas since Roy Williams' 1999–2000 Jayhawks went 24–10.

As usual, Kansas signed another highly regarded recruiting class, adding Kelly Oubre, Jr. and Cliff Alexander to its roster, and the Jayhawks began the campaign as the #5 team in the country for the second straight year. KU stumbled out of the gate with a humbling 32-point defeat at the hands of #1 Kentucky in its second game, and then also suffered an embarrassing 25-point loss on the road at Temple in late December. Once Big 12 play rolled around, however, the Jayhawks regained momentum, winning eight of their first nine league contests, ultimately capturing their 11th consecutive Big 12 title.  However, success in the NCAA Tournament would not come as Self's Jayhawks were beaten 78–65 by Wichita State in the round of 32.

2015–19

Self won his 200th game at Allen Fieldhouse this season. At that point, he had only lost 9 games there all-time. Under Self, the Jayhawks finished the regular season in the #1 spot of the AP poll and Coaches poll, securing the #1 seed in the South Region.

KU easily disposed of Austin Peay in its opening round game, 105–79, and then defeated UConn in the second round to advance to the Sweet 16 to face Maryland. After a slow start by the Jayhawks, Kansas rallied to win over the Terrapins, 79–63. The Jayhawks then lost a closely fought matchup against the eventual national champions Villanova in the Elite Eight, 64–59.

On November 18, 2016, after an 86–65 win over Siena, Self passed Ted Owens for most wins at Allen Fieldhouse with 207. On December 6, 2016, Self achieved his 600th win with a 105–62 win over UMKC. He is the 9th fastest coach in NCAA history to win 600 games. On February 18, 2017, Self was announced as one of 14 finalists named from over 100 candidates to be inducted into the Naismith Memorial Basketball Hall of Fame in his first year of eligibility. The inductees were announced April 3 prior to the National Championship game. The team went on to win the Big 12 regular season title for a record 13th straight season. The team was led by guard Frank Mason who went on to be the consensus National Player of the Year.

Kansas began their season with complications as star freshman Billy Preston was sidelined due to an NCAA investigation. Even without Preston, Kansas began their season by winning their first seven games including a quality win against #7 ranked Kentucky. The third win of that streak, over Texas Southern, was Self's 419th win at Kansas, vaulting him past Williams to become the second-winningest coach in school history. The Jayhawks then went on to lose their next two games including a home loss to 16th ranked Arizona State. This would be the first of three home losses for the season with the addition of losses to Texas Tech and Oklahoma State. These three home losses were the most Self has suffered in a single season at Kansas. The team went on to finish the regular season 27–7 before securing the #1 seed in the Midwest Region.

Kansas won their first game against Pennsylvania by wide margin, then fought through and won their next two games against Seton Hall and Clemson to advance to the Elite Eight. In the Elite Eight the Jayhawks faced a tough Duke team and ultimately won in overtime 85–81 to advance to the Final Four where they would fall to #1 seed of the East region Villanova who would go on to become the national champions.

2019–2021
The Jayhawks finished the 2019–20 regular season 28–3 and were unanimously ranked number one in the final regular season AP poll. The Jayhawks went undefeated against unranked teams and their 3 losses came to ranked teams. The Jayhawks were a favorite to win the NCAA Tournament, however, the NCAA Tournament was cancelled on March 12, 2020, due to the COVID-19 pandemic. The 2020–21 team started 8–1 but struggled in the middle of conference play, finishing with a 21–9 record and a second-round NCAA tournament loss to USC.

In September 2019, Self and the Kansas program were served a Notice of Allegations by the NCAA for five Level 1 violations, a head coach responsibility charge against Self personally, and a lack of institutional control charge against the University of Kansas. Self's individual punishments could include a suspension or an effective ban from college basketball for several years or more (a "show cause" penalty against any program looking to hire Self). Self has denied throughout the investigation that the Kansas coaching staff knew Adidas was paying recruits to go there.

On April 2, 2021, Self signed a lifetime contract with Kansas. Every year after the initial five years, an extra year will be automatically added to the contract and that will continue until he retires or dies. The financial terms of the contract were not immediately disclosed.

2021–22 National Championship season
During the 2021–22 season, Self's Jayhawks won the Big 12 regular season conference title for the 16th time in his 19 seasons as Kansas coach. Self also led his team to a Big 12 tournament title, his 9th in 18 possible conference tournaments. The Jayhawks were awarded the No. 1 seed in the Midwest Region of the NCAA tournament. Self led Kansas to its fourth NCAA National Championship in program history, capped by a 72–69 victory over North Carolina in the National Championship game on April 4, 2022. The Jayhawks overcame a 16-point deficit and a 15-point halftime deficit to win, both NCAA title game records. By winning the title, combined with the retirements of Mike Krzyzewski and Jay Wright at the end of the season, Self moved into a tie with Rick Pitino as the only active coaches with two national championships.

Assists Foundation

In June 2006, Self and his wife, Cindy, established the Assists Foundation, a 501(c)(3) organization to serve as a fundraising conduit for organizations that serve a variety of youth initiatives.  The mission of Assists is to help provide young people access to better lives.

Assists held its first public fundraiser June 7, 2008—Bill's Basketball Boogie (www.basketballboogie.org) at Kansas Speedway. Over fifty local businesses and Kansas supporters signed on to sponsor the event, which offered opportunities to socialize with past and present Kansas basketball elite and to purchase valuable basketball memorabilia and travel and entertainment venues through the auction. Entertainment was provided by Sawyer Brown and Disco Dick.

Head coaching record

Personal life
Self is married with two children, a daughter and a son. His daughter graduated from Kansas in 2013. His son, Tyler, played basketball at Kansas from 2012 to 2017 and is the general manager for the Austin Spurs of the NBA G League. Self is a Christian.

See also
 List of college men's basketball coaches with 600 wins
 List of NCAA Division I Men's Final Four appearances by coach

References

External links

 Kansas Jayhawks bio
 
 Coaching stats
 Playing stats

1962 births
Living people
American Christians
American men's basketball coaches
American men's basketball players
Basketball coaches from Oklahoma
Basketball players from Oklahoma
College men's basketball head coaches in the United States
Edmond Memorial High School alumni
Illinois Fighting Illini men's basketball coaches
Kansas Jayhawks men's basketball coaches
Naismith Memorial Basketball Hall of Fame inductees
Oklahoma State Cowboys basketball coaches
Oklahoma State Cowboys basketball players
Oral Roberts Golden Eagles men's basketball coaches
People from Okmulgee, Oklahoma
Tulsa Golden Hurricane men's basketball coaches